Anokha Ladla is a Pakistani television drama series which ran for three seasons from 2010 to 2013 on PTV Home. The first season was directed by Aamir Yousuf while second and third season was directed by Muhammad Ashar Asghar. The series was co-produced by Saleem Sheikh, who also starred in the series as main character of Meedu.

Season 1 (2010)
Midu (Saleem Sheikh) is an unemployed village lad with limited education who dreams of being big. After participating in his first election and consequently losing, he  decides to move to the city in order to earn money so that he can stand again in the council elections. He befriends a city businessman (Behroze Sabzwari) who mentors Midu whilst he works as his servant.

Season 2 (2012)

Season 3 (2013)

Cast
 Saba Hameed as Muniro
 Fareeha Jabeen as Balaan, Midu's Mother
 Behroze Sabzwari as the City Businessman, Midu's Mentor
 Adnan Jillani as Chaudhry Raheem
 Rija as Seema (Midu's Wife)
 Ghazala Butt
 Saleem Sheikh
 Khayyam Sarhadi

Lux Style Awards

10th Lux Style Awards
 Best TV Play (Terrestrial)-Won
 Best TV Actor (Terrestrial)-Adnan Jilani-Nominated
 Best TV Actor (Terrestrial)-Saleem Sheikh-Nominated
 Best TV Director-Aamir Yousuf-Nominated

12th Lux Style Awards
 Best TV Actor (Terrestrial)-Saleem Sheikh-Nominated

References

External links 
 http://www.pakistantv.tv/tag/anokha-ladla-full-drama/

Pakistan Television Corporation original programming
Pakistani drama television series
Urdu-language television shows
2011 Pakistani television series debuts